Moinul Islam (born 2 December 1996) is a Bangladeshi cricketer who plays for Barisal Division. He made his List A debut on 15 March 2022, for City Club in the 2021–22 Dhaka Premier Division Cricket League.

See also
 List of Barisal Division cricketers

References

External links
 

1996 births
Living people
Bangladeshi cricketers
Barisal Division cricketers
City Club cricketers
Victoria Sporting Club cricketers